Carlo C. Maley (born ca 1969) is the director of the Arizona Cancer and Evolution Center, the first president of the International Society for Evolution, Ecology and Cancer, co-founder and director of the Center for Evolution and Cancer at UCSF and was a member of the advisory board of the National Evolutionary Synthesis Center (NESCent). He is currently an associate professor in The Biodesign Institute and the School of Life Sciences at Arizona State University.

Career
Maley earned a B.A. in computer science and psychology, graduating summa cum laude from Oberlin College in 1991. He was a Marshall Scholar at the University of Oxford, earning his M.Sc. in 1993 in zoology, working with W. D. Hamilton. He then went on to MIT to earn his Ph.D. in computer science in 1998, working with Rodney Brooks and Michael J. Donoghue (then at Harvard). As a postdoc with Stephanie Forrest, Maley started working on cancer and soon after joined Brian J. Reid's lab at the Fred Hutchinson Cancer Research Center. Later he held faculty positions at the Wistar Institute and the University of California San Francisco before moving to Arizona State University.

Maley's work on the evolutionary dynamics underlying cancer progression and susceptibility have contributed to the field of evolution and cancer and the understanding of somatic evolution. Maley is known for his work on the evolutionary dynamics underlying tumor progression and the puzzle of how large and long-lived organisms suppress cancer, also known as Peto's Paradox. He pioneered the use of diversity measures from ecology to profile tumors, so as to predict which benign tumor is likely to become cancerous, and to predict survival of cancer patients. Maley has helped to bring together the cancer biology community and the evolutionary biology community through the activities of the Center for Evolution and Cancer at UCSF and more recently the International Society for Evolution, Ecology and Cancer, including planning and hosting the International Biannual Evolution and Cancer Conferences. Professor Maley is an author of more than 90 peer-reviewed publications with over 12,000 citations.

References

External links 

 Maley's website
 The Arizona Cancer and Evolution Center
 International Society for Evolution, Ecology and Cancer
 Center for Evolution and Cancer at UCSF
 Profile on Google Scholar

Living people
1969 births
Cancer researchers
University of California, San Francisco faculty
Arizona State University faculty
Fred Hutchinson Cancer Research Center people
Oberlin College alumni